Male Vrhe (in older sources also Mali Vrhi) is a small settlement in the hills west of Muljava in the Municipality of Ivančna Gorica in central Slovenia. The municipality is included in the Central Slovenia Statistical Region. The area is part of the historical region of Lower Carniola.

References

External links
Male Vrhe on Geopedia

Populated places in the Municipality of Ivančna Gorica